Greenland Holdings Corp., Ltd. known as Greenland Group is a Chinese real estate developer. It was founded as a state-owned enterprise. , the top 10 shareholders of the listed company owned a combined 88% shares, with some state-owned enterprises having invested in Greenland via private equity funds.

, it owned about US$58 billion in assets. By the company's own estimate, in 2014 it was the largest real estate developer in the world by floor space under construction and sales revenue.

History
Greenland Holdings was created in 1992 to develop green belts around Shanghai. Starting around 2013, it began to make major investments in developments outside of China. , these include Metropolis Los Angeles in Los Angeles, Spire London, a 235-metre residential skyscraper in the London Docklands, Greenland Centre Sydney in Sydney, Atlantic Yards in New York, and an 872 unit condo plus 122 room hotel complex in Toronto.

In 2014 the company took over Shanghai Jinfeng Investment as part of a backdoor listing. Since June 2017, it has been part of Shanghai Stock Exchange's blue chip index: SSE 50 Index.

Non-real estate interests 
Greenland Group are the current majority shareholder of the Chinese Super League club Shanghai Shenhua F.C., having officially taken over the operation of the club after purchasing the 28.5% share owned by previous majority shareholder Zhu Jun in January 2014.

Shareholders and board of directors
Despite 46.37% of the company being owned by the Shanghai Government, some members of the board, current, and former employees also own 28.99% of shares as the second largest shareholder. Both Greenland Holdings and the employee-owned private equity fund are represented by Zhang Yuliang as the legal representative.

The 15-person board of directors consists of 5 independent directors, as well as Zhang Yuliang, Tan Jiancheng, vice-chairman of Greenland Holdings and vice-president of Shanghai Municipal Investment Group), Cai Shunming, vice-chairman of Greenland Holdings and vice-president of Shanghai Land Group), Xu Jing, executive vice-president), Zhang Yun, executive vice-president), Tian Bo, ex-vice president of Greenland Holdings), Ji Guanglin, Greenland Holdings director and chairman of associate company Shanghai SMI Holding, a subsidiary of Shanghai Municipal Investment Group), He Qiju (Greenland Holdings director and a manager of Shanghai Land Group), Zhou Qing (Greenland Holdings director and deputy general manager of associate company Shanghai Star Group, a subsidiary of Shanghai Land Group) and Song Chengli, Greenland Holdings director and vice-chairman of Ping An Trust). To sum up, out of 10 non-independent directors, the Shanghai Government has 5 seats, while Ping An Trust has one seat.

's State-owned Assets Supervision and Administration Commission
 Shanghai Land Group (25.82%)
 Shanghai Municipal Investment Group (20.55%)
 Management board and employee of Greenland Holdings via a private equity fund (28.99%)
 Shenzhen Ping'an Innovation Capital Investment, a subsidiary of Ping An Trust of Ping An Group (6.61%)
 Shanghai Tianchen (2.29%)
 , a private equity fund that CDH Investments acted as GP (1.80%)
 , a private equity fund that SDIC acted as GP (0.91%)
 , an index tracking fund that ICBC acted as GP (0.34%)
 , a private equity fund from Zhuhai (0.33%)

References

External links 
 

Real estate companies of China
Companies based in Shanghai
Real estate companies established in 1992
Companies listed on the Shanghai Stock Exchange
Companies in the CSI 100 Index
Companies owned by the provincial government of China
Employee-owned companies of China
Privatization in China